Ocyrtosoma is a genus of bristle flies in the family Tachinidae. There is at least one described species in Ocyrtosoma, O. rufum.

Distribution
Mexico.

References

Dexiinae
Diptera of North America
Monotypic Brachycera genera
Tachinidae genera
Taxa named by Charles Henry Tyler Townsend